Christophe Kern (born 18 January 1981 in Wissembourg, Bas-Rhin) is a French former road racing cyclist, who rode professionally between 2003 and 2014 for the ,  and  teams.

Major results

1999
 3rd Road race, UCI Junior Road World Championships
2001
 8th Overall Circuit Franco-Belge
2002
 1st Liège–Bastogne–Liège U23
 10th Paris–Mantes-en-Yvelines
2003
 1st Grand Prix Rudy Dhaenens
 5th Grand Prix de la Ville de Lillers
2004
 1st Stage 6 Tour de l'Avenir
2006
 3rd Time trial, National Road Championships
2008
 2nd Time trial, National Road Championships
 2nd Tour du Doubs
2009
 7th Duo Normand (with Julien Fouchard)
2010
 10th Overall Tour of Turkey
1st  Turkish Beauties classification
2011
 1st  Time trial, National Road Championships
 6th Overall Critérium du Dauphiné
1st Stage 5
2014
 1st  Combativity classification Tour du Limousin

Grand Tour general classification results timeline

References

External links
 
Profile at Crédit Agricole official website

1981 births
Living people
People from Wissembourg
French male cyclists
Sportspeople from Bas-Rhin
Cyclists from Grand Est